Martin Robinson (born 19 October 1955) is a British former professional tennis player.

A left-handed player from Bolton, Robinson competed on the professional tour in the 1970s and reached a career singles best ranking of 105 in the world.

In the 1975 season he made the second round of both the Australian Open and French Open.

Robinson also featured in the main draw at Wimbledon during his career, including in 1976 when he lost in the first round to seventh seed Roscoe Tanner.

References

External links
 
 

1955 births
Living people
British male tennis players
Tennis people from Greater Manchester
Sportspeople from Bolton
English male tennis players